The Linden School is an independent, girls school in Toronto, Ontario, Canada. Founded in 1993, The Linden School employs the Ontario Curriculum. With an enrollment of 102 students in JK to grade 12 (as of 2017). The average class size is 11 students. Advanced placement courses are also offered.

History 
The Linden School was co-founded by Diane Goudie and Eleanor Moore and opened its doors to 37 students in 1993. The core vision was feminist pedagogy, an approach to learning rooted in equity, diversity, and empowerment for girls. Goudie and Moore were recognized for their work in girls' education with an honorary doctorate from York University in 2007.

Co-curricular activities 
There are currently 32 co-curricular activities offered at The Linden School.

Traditions 
The Linden School has a range of annual traditions such as the school birthday celebration, which is held on the first day of the school year, all-school activities (weekly), week without walls, festival of lights and spirit week. There is also the opportunity for grade 11 students to participate in a model UN conference in Denmark, and for grade 12 students to organize and participate in a service oriented graduation trip.

References

External links 
 

Private schools in Toronto
Girls' schools in Canada
Educational institutions established in 1993
1993 establishments in Ontario